6546 Kaye is a dark and elongated background asteroid from the outer region of the asteroid belt. It was discovered on 24 February 1987, by Czech astronomer Antonín Mrkos at the South Bohemian Kleť Observatory in the Czech Republic. It was named for American actor Danny Kaye.

Orbit and classification 
When applying the synthetic hierarchical clustering method (HCM) by Nesvorný, or the 1995 HCM-analysis by Zappalà, Kaye is a non-family asteroid of the main belt's background population, while according to another HCM-analysis by Milani and Knežević (AstDyS), it is a core member of the Ursula family, a family of 1,500 asteroids with a C- and X-type.

It orbits the Sun in the outer main-belt at a distance of 2.9–3.6 AU once every 5 years and 9 months (2,113 days). Its orbit has an eccentricity of 0.11 and an inclination of 14° with respect to the ecliptic.

Naming 

This minor planet was named in memory of American actor and singer David Daniel Kaminsky (1911–1987), known by his screen name as "Danny Kaye". Kaye starred in popular feature films such as The Court Jester (1956), typically playing the role of a gentle bumbler who triumphs eventually. The minor planet's name was suggested by G. V. Williams, who made the identifications for this body. The  was published by the Minor Planet Center on 20 June 1997.

Physical characteristics

Rotation period 

In August 2012, two rotational lightcurves of Kaye were obtained from photometric observations at the Palomar Transient Factory in California.

Diameter and albedo 

According to the survey carried out by NASA's Wide-field Infrared Survey Explorer with its subsequent NEOWISE mission, Kaye measures between 21.6 and 23.8 kilometers in diameter and its surface has an albedo between 0.065 and 0.085. The Collaborative Asteroid Lightcurve Link assumes a standard albedo for carbonaceous asteroids of 0.057 and calculates a diameter of 23.2 kilometers with an absolute magnitude of 11.9.

References

External links 
 Lightcurve Database Query (LCDB), at www.minorplanet.info
 Dictionary of Minor Planet Names, Google books
 Asteroids and comets rotation curves, CdR – Geneva Observatory, Raoul Behrend
 Discovery Circumstances: Numbered Minor Planets (5001)-(10000) – Minor Planet Center
 
 

006546
Discoveries by Antonín Mrkos
Named minor planets
19870224